Fickle is an unincorporated community in Washington Township, Clinton County, Indiana.

Geography

History
The town of Fickle is named for Isaac Fickle, one of the early settlers of Washington Township.  It was established as a station along the Toledo, St. Louis and Western Railroad, better known the "Clover Leaf" Railroad; the town's Clover Leaf Church is named for it.

The post office was established at Fickle in 1888, and remained in operation until it was discontinued in 1928.

References

Unincorporated communities in Clinton County, Indiana
Unincorporated communities in Indiana